Joanna Kaczor  (born 16 September 1984) is a Polish volleyball player, a member of Poland women's national volleyball team and Polish club Impel Wrocław, a participant of the Olympic Games Beijing 2008, bronze medalist of European Championship 2009), Polish Champion (2009, 2011).

Early life
Kaczor was born on September 16, 1984 in Wroclaw, Poland to Stanisław and Helena Kaczor.

College career

College of Southern Idaho

Kaczor was the National Junior College Athletic Association Player of the Year in her 2005 freshman season after the team went 50-2 to win the NJCAA national championship under head coach Ben Stroud. Kaczor led the team with 605 kills on the season (4.96 kpg) with a .456 hitting percentage.

University of Southern California

Kaczor transferred to USC in 2006, and was a two time All-American and set several school single-season and career marks She set the top two single-season records for kills (659 in 2007 and 563 in 2006), top two marks for attempts (1,542 in 2007 and 1,272 in 2006), top two marks for total points (745.5 in 2007 and 642.5 in 2006) and top mark for points per game (5.83 in 2007). Her 5.64 ppg in 2006 tied the former record held by Bibiana Candelas in 2005.

National team

Kaczor has been in the Polish National Team program since 2000 and is a current member of the National Team. As a member of the Junior National Team, her squad finished third at the 2003 World Junior Championship and won the 2002 European Junior Championship.

Kaczor played with Poland at the 2008 Summer Olympics.

References

External links
 Kaczor at USCtrojans.com

1984 births
Living people
Sportspeople from Wrocław
Sportspeople from Lower Silesian Voivodeship
Opposite hitters
Polish women's volleyball players
Southern Idaho Golden Eagles women's volleyball players
Olympic volleyball players of Poland
Expatriate volleyball players in the United States
Polish expatriates in the United States
USC Trojans women's volleyball players
Volleyball players at the 2008 Summer Olympics